Alfred "Fred" Schreiner (born 2 July 1961) is a retired Luxembourgian football midfielder.

References

1961 births
Living people
Luxembourgian footballers
FA Red Boys Differdange players
FC Avenir Beggen players
Association football midfielders
Luxembourg international footballers